Moeydeleh or Moedeleh may refer to:
 Moeydeleh-ye Olya
 Moeydeleh-ye Sofla